Tripartite motif-containing protein 31 is a protein that in humans is encoded by the TRIM31 gene.

The protein encoded by this gene is a member of the tripartite motif (TRIM) family. The TRIM motif includes three zinc-binding domains, a RING, a B-box type 1 and a B-box type 2, and a coiled-coil region. The protein localizes to both the cytoplasm and the nucleus. Its function has not been identified.

Interactions
TRIM31 has been shown to interact with TRIM23.

References

Further reading